Marchi (also Romanized as Mārchī) is a village in Emamzadeh Abdol Aziz Rural District, Jolgeh District, Isfahan County, Isfahan Province, Iran. At the 2006 census, its population was 119, in 25 families.

References 

Populated places in Isfahan County